Brownsville Northside Historic District is a national historic district located adjacent to the Brownsville Commercial Historic District at Brownsville, Fayette County, Pennsylvania.  The district includes 188 contributing buildings and 2 contributing sites in a neighborhood of Brownsville. Most of the contributing buildings are residential, with some commercial buildings and nine churches. The house styles are reflective of a number of popular 19th- and early-20th-century architectural styles including Colonial Revival, Bungalow / American Craftsman, and Greek Revival. The oldest building is Brashear's Tavern (c. 1797), and there are five buildings that date between 1815 and 1840.  The contributing sites are cemeteries associated with two of the churches.  Located in the district and separately listed are the St. Peter's Church and Bowman's Castle.

It was added to the National Register of Historic Places in 1993.

References

Greek Revival architecture in Pennsylvania
Colonial Revival architecture in Pennsylvania
Historic districts in Fayette County, Pennsylvania
Historic districts on the National Register of Historic Places in Pennsylvania
National Register of Historic Places in Fayette County, Pennsylvania